Plinia martinellii, commonly known as  (little forest jabuticaba), is a species of plant in the family Myrtaceae. It is endemic to the Atlantic Rainforest in the state of Rio de Janeiro, Brazil. This small tree produces dark blue-black fruits, around 20mm in diameter.

References

martinellii
Crops originating from the Americas
Crops originating from Brazil
Tropical fruit
Endemic flora of Brazil
Fruits originating in South America
Cauliflory
Fruit trees
Berries